Scores and results list France's points tally first.

Notes

France
tour
France national rugby union team tours
Rugby union tours of Canada
Rugby union tours of Japan
1978 in Canadian rugby union